The women's 4x100 metres relay event at the 1992 World Junior Championships in Athletics was held in Seoul, Korea, at Olympic Stadium on 19 and 20 September.

Medalists

Results

Final
20 September

Heats
19 September

Heat 1

Heat 2

Participation
According to an unofficial count, 66 athletes from 16 countries participated in the event.

References

4 x 100 metres relay
Relays at the World Athletics U20 Championships